David Tzuriel is an Israeli clinical and educational psychologist. His expertise is dynamic assessment. Currently he works as a professor at Bar Ilan University. He was born on September 23, 1946.

References

External links
 Homepage of David Tzuriel

Israeli psychologists
Academic staff of Bar-Ilan University
Bar-Ilan University alumni
Vanderbilt University alumni
Educational psychologists
Living people
1946 births
Place of birth missing (living people)